Tootsie is a 1982 American satirical romantic comedy film directed by Sydney Pollack and starring Dustin Hoffman. Its supporting cast includes Pollack, Jessica Lange, Teri Garr, Dabney Coleman, Bill Murray, Charles Durning, George Gaynes, Geena Davis (in her debut) and Doris Belack. The film tells the story of a talented but volatile actor whose reputation for being difficult drives him to adopt a new identity as a woman to land a job. The film was adapted by Larry Gelbart, Barry Levinson (uncredited), Elaine May (uncredited) and Murray Schisgal from a story by Gelbart and Don McGuire.

Tootsie was a major critical and financial success, become the second-most profitable film of 1982, and was nominated for ten Academy Awards including Best Picture. However, Lange was the only winner, receiving the award for Best Supporting Actress.

In 1998, the Library of Congress deemed the film "culturally, historically, or aesthetically significant" and selected it for preservation in the United States National Film Registry. Its theme song, "It Might Be You", performed by Stephen Bishop, was a Top 40 hit in the United States.

Plot
Michael Dorsey is a respected actor, but nobody in New York City wants to hire him because he is a perfectionist and difficult to work with. He makes ends meet by working as a server in a restaurant and teaching acting classes. After many months without an acting job, Michael hears of an opening on the popular daytime soap opera Southwest General from his friend and acting student Sandy Lester, who tries out unsuccessfully for the role of hospital administrator Emily Kimberly. In desperation, and following an argument with his agent, Michael impersonates a woman, auditioning as "Dorothy Michaels", and gets the hospital administrator part. Michael takes the job as a way to raise $8,000 to produce a play by his roommate Jeff Slater, which will star himself and Sandy. As “Dorothy”, Michael plays Emily Kimberly as a feisty feminist, which surprises the other actors and the crew, who expected her to be (as written) another swooning female. His character quickly becomes a national sensation.

When Sandy catches Michael in her bedroom half undressed because he wants to try on her clothes for ideas for Dorothy's wardrobe, he covers up by claiming he wants to have sex with her. Sandy is receptive and they sleep together. Exacerbating matters further, he is attracted to one of his co-stars, Julie Nichols, a single mother in an unhealthy relationship with the show's amoral, sexist director, Ron Carlisle. At a party, when Michael (as himself) approaches Julie with a pick-up line to which she had previously told Dorothy she would be receptive, she throws a drink in his face. Later, as Dorothy, when he makes tentative advances, Julie—having just ended her relationship with Ron per Dorothy's advice—makes it known that she is not a lesbian.

Meanwhile, Dorothy has her own admirers to contend with: older cast member John Van Horn and Julie's widowed father, Les. Les proposes marriage, insisting that Dorothy think about it before answering. When Michael returns home, he finds John, who almost forces himself on Dorothy until Jeff walks in on them. A few minutes later, Sandy arrives, asking why he has not answered her calls. Michael admits he is in love with another woman, and Sandy screams and breaks up with him.

The tipping point comes when, due to Dorothy's popularity, the show's producers want to extend her contract for another year. Michael extricates himself when a technical problem forces the cast to perform live, by improvising a revelation about Emily: that she is actually Edward, Emily's twin brother who took her place to avenge her. This allows everybody a way out, but Julie is so outraged at Michael's deception that she punches him in the groin once the cameras have stopped rolling and storms off.

Some weeks later, Michael is moving forward with producing Jeff's play. He returns Les's engagement ring, and Les says, "The only reason you're still living is because I never kissed you." Despite his anger, Les admits that Michael was good company as Dorothy, and Michael buys him a beer.

Michael later waits for Julie outside the studio. She is reluctant to talk to him, but he tells her that he and her father played pool and had a good time. She finally admits she misses Dorothy. Michael tells her Dorothy is within him and he misses her too, adding, "I was a better man with you as a woman than I ever was with a woman as a man." Julie forgives him and they walk away together, engaged in conversation.

Cast

Production
In the 1970s, fashion company executive Charles Evans began filmmaking, following in the path of his brother Robert Evans, a successful actor, producer and studio executive,, "because I enjoy movies very much. I have the time to do it. And I believe if done wisely, it can be a profitable business." In the early 1970s, Don McGuire's Would I Lie to You?, a play about an unemployed male actor who cross-dresses in order to find jobs, was shopped around Hollywood for several years until it came to the attention of comedian and actor Buddy Hackett in 1978. Interested in playing the role of the talent agent, Hackett showed Evans the script, and Evans purchased an option on the play. Delays in the film's production forced Evans to renew the option, but in 1979, he cowrote a screenplay based on the play with director Dick Richards and screenwriter Bob Kaufman. A few months into the process, Richards shared the screenplay with Dustin Hoffman, his partner in a company that bought and developed film-development properties. Hoffman wanted complete creative control and Evans agreed to remove himself from screenwriting tasks, instead becoming a producer of the film, which was renamed Tootsie. Before Hoffman officially became involved, his role had been offered to Peter Sellers and Michael Caine.

The film remained in development for another year as producers waited for a revised script. As preproduction began, the project experienced additional delays when Richards left as director over "creative differences." He instead became one of the film's producers, and Hal Ashby became the director. Columbia  then forced Ashby to quit because of the threat of legal action that would ensue if his postproduction commitments on Lookin' to Get Out were not fulfilled. In November 1981, Sydney Pollack agreed to direct and produce the film at Columbia's suggestion.

Hoffman suggested that Pollack play Michael's agent George Fields, a role written for Dabney Coleman. Pollack resisted the idea, but Hoffman eventually convinced him; it was Pollack's first acting work in years. Pollack cast Coleman as the sexist, arrogant soap opera director Ron Carlisle.

To prepare for his role, Hoffman watched the 1978 film La Cage aux Folles several times. He also visited the set of General Hospital for research and conducted extensive makeup tests. Hoffman has stated that he was shocked to learn that although makeup could be used to allow him to credibly appear as a woman, he would never be a beautiful one. His epiphany occurred when he realized that although he found Dorothy interesting, he would not have spoken to her at a party because she was not beautiful, and because of this, he had missed the opportunity for many conversations with interesting women. He concluded that he had never regarded Tootsie as a comedy.

Scenes set at New York's Russian Tea Room were filmed in the actual restaurant, with additional scenes shot in Central Park and in front of Bloomingdale's. Scenes were also filmed in Hurley, New York and at the National Video Studios in New York. Additional filming took place in Fort Lee, New Jersey.

Reception

Box office
Tootsie opened in 943 theaters in the United States and Canada and grossed $5,540,470 during its opening weekend. After 115 days, it surpassed Close Encounters of the Third Kind as Columbia's greatest domestic hit of all time. Its final gross in the United States and Canada was $177,200,000, making it the second-highest-grossing movie of 1982 after E.T. the Extra-Terrestrial. Box Office Mojo estimates that the film sold more than 56.9 million tickets in the U.S.

The film grossed more than $64 million internationally and was the highest-grossing film in Germany, with a gross of $19 million. Worldwide, its gross exceeds $241 million.

Critical response
On Rotten Tomatoes, the film has a 90% approval rating based on 52 reviews, with an average rating of 7.8/10. The critical consensus reads: "Tootsie doesn't squander its high-concept comedy premise with fine dialogue and sympathetic treatment of the characters". On Metacritic, the film has a score of 88% based on reviews from 21 critics, indicating "universal acclaim."

Roger Ebert praised the film, awarding it four out of four stars and observing: "Tootsie is the kind of Movie with a capital M that they used to make in the 1940s, when they weren't afraid to mix up absurdity with seriousness, social comment with farce, and a little heartfelt tenderness right in there with the laughs. This movie gets you coming and going...The movie also manages to make some lighthearted but well-aimed observations about sexism. It also pokes satirical fun at soap operas, New York show business agents and the Manhattan social pecking order."

Accolades

In 2011, ABC aired a primetime special, Best in Film: The Greatest Movies of Our Time, that counted down the best movies chosen by fans based on results of a poll conducted by both ABC and People Weekly Magazine. Tootsie was selected as the  5 Best Comedy.

The film is recognized by American Film Institute in these lists:
 1998: AFI's 100 Years...100 Movies – #62
 2000: AFI's 100 Years...100 Laughs – #2
 2007: AFI's 100 Years...100 Movies (10th Anniversary Edition) – #69

National Film Registry — Inducted in 1998.

Home media

The film was first released on CED Videodisc in 1983, on VHS and Betamax videocassettes by RCA/Columbia Pictures Home Video in 1985 and on DVD in 2001. These releases were distributed by Columbia TriStar Home Video. The film was also released by the Criterion Collection in a LaserDisc edition in 1992. A special 25th-anniversary edition DVD was released by Sony Pictures in 2008. The film was released on Blu-ray disc in 2013, but only for selected international territories such as Germany and Japan. The film was released on Blu-ray and DVD by the Criterion Collection on December 16, 2014.

Musical adaptation

A stage musical of the film premiered at the Cadillac Palace Theatre in Chicago from September 11 to October 14, 2018 before opening on Broadway in the spring of 2019. The musical has music and lyrics by David Yazbek. Robert Horn wrote the book, Denis Jones choreographed and Scott Ellis directed. Santino Fontana starred as Michael Dorsey. He was joined by Lilli Cooper as Julie Nichols, Sarah Stiles as Sandy Lester, John Behlmann as Max Van Horn, Andy Grotelueschen as Jeff Slater, Julie Halston as Rita Mallory, Tony Award winner Michael McGrath as Stan Fields and Tony nominee Reg Rogers as Ron Carlisle.

See also
 Cross-dressing in film and television
 List of highest-grossing films in Canada and the United States

Notes

References

External links

 
 
 
 
 
 Tootsie essay by Brian Scott Mednick at National Film Registry
 Tootsie essay by Daniel Eagan in Film Legacy: The Authoritative Guide to the Landmark Movies in the National Film Registry, A&C Black, 2010 , pages 780–781
 The 25th Anniversary Tootsie by Billy Mernit
 Tootsie: One Great Dame, an essay by Michael Sragow at the Criterion Collection

1982 films
1982 comedy-drama films
1982 romantic comedy films
1982 romantic drama films
1980s English-language films
1980s American films
1980s romantic comedy-drama films
1980s feminist films
American films based on plays
American romantic comedy-drama films
American feminist films
Best Musical or Comedy Picture Golden Globe winners
Columbia Pictures films
Cross-dressing in American films
Films about actors
Films about soap operas
Films about anti-LGBT sentiment
Films directed by Sydney Pollack
Films featuring a Best Musical or Comedy Actor Golden Globe winning performance
Films featuring a Best Supporting Actress Academy Award-winning performance
Films featuring a Best Supporting Actress Golden Globe-winning performance
Films produced by Sydney Pollack
Films scored by Dave Grusin
Films set in New York City
Films shot in Fort Lee, New Jersey
Films shot in New York City
Films with screenplays by Larry Gelbart
National Society of Film Critics Award for Best Film winners
United States National Film Registry films